Unlimited (stylized as unlimited) is the third compilation album by Japanese singer Shizuka Kudo. It was released on November 14, 1990, through Pony Canyon. The album features all original recordings of the singles released from "Koi Hitoyo" (1988) through "Watashi ni Tsuite" (1990), as well as reworked versions with new vocal takes of Kudo's first batch of singles, from "Kindan no Telepathy" through "Mugon... Iroppoi". The album also includes a new song, entitled "Koi Moyō", co-written by Kudo herself, under the pseudonym Aeri, specifically for the album.

Commercial performance
Unlimited debuted at number two on the Oricon Albums Chart, with 134,000 units sold. It dropped three positions to number five on its second week, with 66,000 copies sold. It slid to number six the following week, selling 39,000 copies. The album held onto the top ten for another week, sliding to number nine and selling 29,000 copies. Unlimited spent another six non-consecutive weeks in the top twenty. It charted for a total of eighteen weeks in the top 100, logging sales of 454,000 copies during its run. Unlimited ranked at number 97 on the year-end Oricon Albums Chart for 1990 and peaked on the chart at number 53 in 1991.

Track listing

Charts

Certification

Release history

References

1990 compilation albums
Shizuka Kudo albums
Pony Canyon compilation albums